HD 86081 b or Santamasa, meaning 'clouded' in Sanskrit, is a gas giant exoplanet that orbits close to its host star HD 86081 or Bibha, completing its orbit in only 2.1375 days. With such a short orbit it belongs to the class of exoplanets known as hot Jupiters. Like most Hot Jupiters, the orbit is nearly circular, with an eccentricity of 0.008.
On 17 December 2019, the International Astronomical Union, Paris has selected the name 'Santamasa' (सन्तमस् in Sanskrit language) suggested by 13 year old Vidyasagar Daud, class 8th student of Sinhgad Spring  Dale Public School, Pune, India for the exoplanet HD 86081 b, This large scale election procedure has come up across India. The name echoes the Indian sentiments through the name 'Sant' (संत), 'Tamas' (तमस्) refers to "darkness", similarly the entire name 'Santamasa' matched with the characteristics of the exoplanet being clouded.

References

External links
 

Hot Jupiters
Exoplanets discovered in 2006
Giant planets
Sextans (constellation)
Exoplanets detected by radial velocity
Exoplanets with proper names